Heaton is an unincorporated community in Avery County, North Carolina, United States. The community is located along NC 194, centered at the Heaton Bridge, which crosses over the Elk River.

See also
 Beech Mountain (North Carolina)
 Elk River (North Carolina)

References

Unincorporated communities in Avery County, North Carolina
Unincorporated communities in North Carolina